Lyristes is a genus of cicadas from Europe and the Middle East. It was described by G. Horvath in 1926.

Many authors previously listed the species of Lyristes under genus Tibicen Berthold, 1827, which shares the same type species. However, in 2021, this senior objective synonym was placed on the Official Index of Rejected and Invalid Generic Names in Zoology by Opinion 2475 of the International Commission on Zoological Nomenclature.

Beginning in 2015, many American and Asian species were moved from this genus to create the new genera Auritibicen, Hadoa, Neotibicen, and Megatibicen, following molecular and morphological evidence.

Species
The following species are recognized:
 Lyristes armeniacus (Kolenati, 1857)
 Lyristes esfandiarii (Dlabola, 1970)
 Lyristes gemellus Boulard, 1988
 Lyristes isodoi Boulard, 1988
 Lyristes plebejus (Scopoli, 1763)

Fossil species
 †Lyristes emathion (Heer, 1853)
 †Lyristes renei Riou, 1995

References

Cryptotympanini
Cicadidae genera